The Middle European League, shortly MEL (in Hungarian: Közép-Európai Liga) was a top-level regional women's basketball league, featuring teams from Hungary, Slovakia and Croatia. The competition was founded in 2012 and folded after two seasons in 2014.

History
Originally created as a joint Hungarian-Slovak competition, the inaugural season had 8 teams competing (4 from Hungary and 4 from Slovakia). It ran simultaneously with the Hungarian and Slovak domestic leagues, and the results between teams from the same country counted for both MEL and domestic leagues.

In the second and last season, 11 teams participated (5 from Hungary, 5 from Slovakia and 1 from Croatia).

Finals

Champions

MVP by edition
2012–13 - 
2013–14 -  Jia Perkins

References

External links
 Official website (archived)
 Profile at eurobasket.com

     
Defunct women's basketball leagues in Europe
Defunct multi-national basketball leagues in Europe
Basketball leagues in Croatia
Basketball leagues in Hungary
Basketball leagues in Slovakia
Women's basketball competitions in Croatia
Women's basketball competitions in Hungary
Women's basketball in Slovakia
Sports leagues established in 2012
2012 establishments in Europe
Multi-national women's basketball leagues in Europe